Eretmocera is a genus of moths in the family Scythrididae.

Species
 Eretmocera agassizi Bengtsson, 2014
 Eretmocera albistriata Legrand, 1966
 Eretmocera alenica Strand, 1913
 Eretmocera arabica Amsel, 1961
 Eretmocera aurovittata Pagenstecher, 1900 (from the  Bismarck islands)
 Eretmocera basistrigata Walsingham, 1889
 Eretmocera benitonis Strand, 1913
 Eretmocera bradleyi Amsel, 1961
 Eretmocera chrysias (Meyrick, 1887) (from Australia)
 Eretmocera contermina Meyrick, 1926
 Eretmocera coracopis (Turner, 1927) (from Australia)
 Eretmocera cyanauges Turner, 1913 (from Australia)
 Eretmocera cyanosoma Meyrick, 1910 (from Sumba)
 Eretmocera dioctis (Meyrick, 1897) (from Australia)
 Eretmocera dorsistrigata Walsingham, 1889
 Eretmocera fasciata Walsingham, 1896
 Eretmocera florifera Meyrick, 1909
 Eretmocera fuscipennis Zeller, 1852
 Eretmocera haemogastra Meyrick, 1936
 Eretmocera homalocrossa Meyrick, 1930
 Eretmocera impactella (Walker, 1864)
 Eretmocera jemensis Rebel, 1930
 Eretmocera katangensis Bengtsson, 2014
 Eretmocera kochi Bengtsson, 2014
 Eretmocera laetissima Zeller, 1852
 Eretmocera letabensis Bengtsson, 2014
 Eretmocera levicornella Rebel, 1917
 Eretmocera lyneborgi Bengtsson, 2014
 Eretmocera malelanensis Bengtsson, 2014
 Eretmocera medinella (Staudinger, 1859)
 Eretmocera meyi Bengtsson, 2014
 Eretmocera microbarbara Walsingham, 1907 (from Algeria)
 Eretmocera monophaea Meyrick, 1927
 Eretmocera nomadica Walsingham, 1907 (from Algeria)
 Eretmocera pachypennis Strand, 1913
 Eretmocera percnophanes Meyrick, 1929 (from the Philippines)
 Eretmocera rubripennis Meyrick, 1915 (from India)
 Eretmocera scatospila Zeller, 1852
 Eretmocera shoabensis Rebel, 1907
 Eretmocera syleuta Meyrick, 1926
 Eretmocera thephagones van Gijen, 1912 (from Java)
 Eretmocera tiwiensis Bengtsson, 2014
 Eretmocera typhonica Meyrick, 1917
 Eretmocera xanthonota Meyrick, 1910 (from Sumba)

Former species
 Eretmocera carteri Walsingham, 1889
 Eretmocera illucens Meyrick, 1914

References
Markku Savela's ftp.funet.fi
Walsingham, 1889. Lord Walsingham's monograph of the genera connecting Tinaegeria with Eretmocera. Trans.Ent.Soc.Lond, 1889

 
Moth genera